The Canton of Canet-en-Roussillon is a French former canton of Pyrénées-Orientales department, in Languedoc-Roussillon. It had 23,061 inhabitants (2012). It was disbanded following the French canton reorganisation which came into effect in March 2015.

Composition
The canton of Canet-en-Roussillon comprised 4 communes:
Canet-en-Roussillon 
Sainte-Marie
Saint-Nazaire
Villelongue-de-la-Salanque

References

Canet-en-Roussillon
2015 disestablishments in France
States and territories disestablished in 2015